American Music Club was an American, San Francisco-based indie rock band, led by singer-songwriter Mark Eitzel. Formed in 1983, the band released seven albums before splitting up in 1995. They reformed in 2003 and released two further albums.

History
Although born in California, Eitzel spent his formative years in Okinawa (Japan), Taiwan, Southampton (the United Kingdom) and Ohio (United States) before returning to the Bay Area in 1981. After a brief stint with the bands The Cowboys (one single: "Supermarket"/"Teenage Life") and The Naked Skinnies (one single) he founded American Music Club in San Francisco in 1983 with guitarist Scott Alexander, drummer Greg Bonnell and bass player Brad Johnson. The band went through many personnel changes before arriving at a stable line up of guitarist Vudi (Mark Pankler), bassist Danny Pearson, keyboardist Brad Johnson and drummer Matt Norelli. This lineup would change over the next several years, but Eitzel always remained the core of the band in terms of its vocals, lyrics and thematic focus, with Vudi and Pearson accompanying him on guitar and bass.

Their 1985 debut, The Restless Stranger, released on Grifter Records, is widely considered as the first slowcore release, establishing the band as major pioneers of slowcore and an early influence on post-rock. It was later followed by 1987's Engine which saw record producer Tom Mallon as a full-time member.

American Music Club earned a solid cult following in Europe on the strength of 1988's California. Their next LP, 1989's United Kingdom, was a UK-only release comprising new material, some of which was recorded live at the Hotel Utah in San Francisco. These two albums were described by Ian Canadine in Rock: The Rough Guide as "the band's two unequivocal masterpieces".

In 1991 American Music Club released Everclear, which has been described as "more polished and radio-friendly" compared to the previous albums, with David Sprague, writing for Trouser Press stating the "slickened production works against the band", but as the band's masterpiece by AllMusic writer Jason Ankeny. Critical acclaim attracted the attention of several major labels. Rolling Stone called it the Album of the Year and named Eitzel Songwriter of the Year for 1991. Eventually, AMC—now consisting of Eitzel, Vudi, Pearson, multi-instrumentalist Bruce Kaphan and drummer Tim Mooney—signed with Reprise in the US and Virgin throughout the rest of the world.

The band contributed the track "All Your Jeans Were Too Tight" to the 1993 AIDS-Benefit Album No Alternative produced by the Red Hot Organization. The album Mercury, produced by Mitchell Froom, followed in 1993 and, despite positive reviews (although Canadine considered it over-produced), the album only reached number 41 on the UK Albums Chart and got little radio and television exposure. In 1994, AMC issued San Francisco, which balanced confessional tunes like "Fearless" and "The Thorn in My Side Is Gone" alongside more accessible offerings such as "Wish the World Away".

The band disbanded in 1995, with Eitzel concentrating on his solo career, having already released a solo live album and en EP as side projects. Vudi subsequently formed Clovis de la Floret while working as a bus driver in Los Angeles.

The band reunited in 2003, with Eitzel joined by Pearson and Mooney, and later Vudi and keyboard player Marc Capelle, to record a new album, Love Songs for Patriots (released in 2004), which is described by AllMusic reviewer Mark Deming as "a stronger and more coherent effort than the group's last set, 1994's San Francisco, and while it's too early to tell if this is a new start or a last hurrah for AMC, it at least shows that their formula still yields potent results. Here's hoping Eitzel and Vudi have more where this came from."

A performance in Pittsburgh on November 10, 2004, was released as a live CD, A Toast To You, on January 1, 2005. The band then consisted of Eitzel, Vudi, Pearson, Mooney, with Jason Borger on keyboards.

On June 20, 2007, AMC announced a new lineup connected to the band's base of operations moving to Los Angeles. Eitzel and Vudi remained, while Mooney and Pearson stayed behind in San Francisco. They were replaced by bassist Sean Hoffman and drummer Steve Didelot from the band the Larks. AMC's next record, entitled The Golden Age, was released in the UK on February 4, 2008, on Cooking Vinyl and in the US on February 19 on Merge Records.

The band split up again around 2010.

Tim Mooney died of a blood clot in June 2012; he was 53.

Tom Mallon died after a long battle with brain cancer on January 9, 2014; he was 57.

Discography

Albums

Studio

Live
 A Toast To You – Live in Pittsburgh, PA, November 10, 2004 (January 2005), Undertow

Compilations

Singles and EPs

References

External links
 (archived)
Mark Eitzel official website
American Music Club collection at the Internet Archive's live music archive

Indie rock musical groups from California
Folk rock groups from California
Musical groups from San Francisco
Musical groups established in 1982
Musical groups disestablished in 1994
Musical groups reestablished in 2004
Sadcore and slowcore groups
Cooking Vinyl artists
Merge Records artists
Reprise Records artists
Virgin Records artists
Warner Records artists
American musical trios
1982 establishments in California